Paul M. Brousseau (born September 18, 1973) is a Canadian former professional ice hockey forward. He played for the Colorado Avalanche, Tampa Bay Lightning, and Florida Panthers in the NHL.

Playing career
Brousseau was selected in the second round of the 1992 NHL Entry Draft, 28th overall, by the Quebec Nordiques. Paul was selected from the QMJHL where he played for the Chicoutimi Saguenéens, Trois-Rivières Draveurs and the Hull Olympiques.

Brousseau made his professional debut in the 1993–94 season playing with the Nordiques affiliate, the Cornwall Aces of the AHL. Upon the Nordiques relocation Brousseau made his NHL debut with the Colorado Avalanche in their inaugural season in 1995–96, playing in 8 games and scoring his only NHL goal.

On September 10, 1996, Brousseau signed as a free agent with the Tampa Bay Lightning, however spent the majority of the next two seasons with the Lightning's affiliate, the Adirondack Red Wings. Prior to the 1998–99 season, Brousseau was claimed in the expansion draft by the Nashville Predators on June 26, 1998.

Unable to get a game with the Predators, Brousseau left as a free agent and signed with the Florida Panthers on September 20, 1999. By now, a career minor-leaguer, Paul played only one game with the Panthers in the 2000–01 season before leaving for Europe.

Brousseau played in Sweden, Finland, Switzerland and Germany before returning to North America for one last season for the Verdun Dragons of the LNAH in 2004-05.

Career statistics

Awards and achievements

References

External links 

1973 births
Living people
Adirondack Red Wings players
Chicoutimi Saguenéens (QMJHL) players
Colorado Avalanche players
Cornwall Aces players
Florida Panthers players
Hershey Bears players
Hull Olympiques players
Ice hockey people from Montreal
Kassel Huskies players
Louisville Panthers players
Milwaukee Admirals players
People from Pierrefonds-Roxboro
Quebec Nordiques draft picks
Schwenninger Wild Wings players
Tampa Bay Lightning players
Trois-Rivières Draveurs players
Canadian ice hockey right wingers